The Sutean language (Sutû) is a tongue mentioned by a clay tablet from the Middle Assyrian Empire, presumably originating from the city of Emar in what is now northeast Syria, among a list of languages spoken in the region. The other languages are Akkadian, Amorite, Gutian, "Subarean" (Hurrian) and Elamite. The Sutean people may have lived in the region of Suhum. Their language is only known from names, most of which are Akkadian or Amorite. The few which are neither also appear to be Semitic. Such names include the name of a Sutean tribe, "Almutu", and the Sutean warrior "Yatpan" who was mentioned in 13th century BCE Ugaritic texts.

Wolfgang Heimpel suggests Sutean may have been an early form of Aramaic or even Arabic, while emphasizing the former.

References

Sources
Wolfgang Heimpel (2003), Letters to the King of Mari: A New Translation, with Historical Introduction, Notes, and Commentary. Eisenbrauns.

Unclassified Semitic languages
Languages attested from the 3rd millennium BC